Joel Howard "J. H." Wyman (born January 5, 1967) is a film and TV producer, screenwriter, director and musician. He is best known for his work  on the Fox science fiction shows Fringe and Almost Human, and wrote and produced the films The Mexican (2001) and Dead Man Down (2013).

Life and career
Wyman was born January 5, 1967, in Oakland, California, but grew up in Montreal, Quebec. He left for Toronto to pursue an acting career and later attended the American Academy of Dramatic Arts in Los Angeles, California.

After a short stint as an actor (using the stage name Joel Wyner) which included roles in the TV-series Catwalk (1992) and Sirens (1993), Wyman segued into writing and producing. His first major feature script was The Mexican (2001) starring Julia Roberts and Brad Pitt, directed by acclaimed director Gore Verbinski. He then created the FOX series Keen Eddie (2003).

In 2008, Wyman joined the first season of the FOX science fiction series Fringe as a writer and co-executive producer. At the start of season two, he was promoted to executive producer and co-showrunner (titles he shared with Jeff Pinkner). At the beginning of season five, he became the sole showrunner. He also directed two episodes: "A Short Story About Love" (Season 4, Episode 15) and the season-five finale, "An Enemy of Fate".

Wyman is the creator, executive producer and showrunner of the FOX science-fiction series Almost Human (2013).

In 1997, Wyman formed his production company, Frequency Films, which produced such film and TV projects as Pale Saints, Keen Eddie, Almost Human and Dead Man Down.

He is also a musician and performs with the alternative rock band Angels of Mercy. On December 4, 2016, Main Man Records will release Angels of Mercy's self-titled debut.

On January 11, 2020, Wyman wrote a script for the pilot episode of a new Debris television series for Legendary Television and Universal Television. On June 29, 2020, NBC announced that the production had been given a series order.

Filmography

Film

Television

References

External links
 
 Angels of Mercy

1967 births
Living people
People from Oakland, California
American male screenwriters
American television writers
American television directors
Television producers from California
American Academy of Dramatic Arts alumni
American male television writers
Showrunners
Film directors from California
Screenwriters from California